This is a list of the Austrian Singles Chart number-one hits of 2000.

See also
2000 in music

References

2000 in Austria
2000 record charts
Lists of number-one songs in Austria